Len Clark may refer to:
Len Clark (cricketer)
Len Clark (footballer)
Len Clark (countryside campaigner)

See also
Len Clarke, Australian rules footballer